Singularity is a Swiss/American science fiction film. It was written and directed by Robert Kouba, and its first shoot, in 2013, starred Julian Schaffner, Jeannine Wacker and Carmen Argenziano. The film was first released in 2017, after further scenes with John Cusack were added.

Plot
In 2020, robotics company C.E.O. Elias VanDorne reveals Kronos, the supercomputer he has invented to end all wars. Kronos decides that mankind is responsible for all wars and it tries to use robots to kill all humans. VanDorne and Damien Walsh, a colleague, upload themselves into Kronos and watch the destruction. Ninety-seven years later, Andrew, a kind-hearted young man, wakes up in a ruined world. VanDorne and Walsh, still in Kronos, watch Andrew meet Calia, a teenage girl who seeks the last human settlement, the Aurora. Though Calia is first reluctant to let Andrew accompany her, still shaken by a drone attack that resulted in her parents leaving her alone with her fatally wounded sister, the two later fall in love. Unbeknownst to them, VanDorne and Walsh are monitoring the pair, hoping that they would show them the way to Aurora.

During their travels, they come across a pack of marauders, who manage to capture Andrew, forcing Calia to abandon him, only for her to return later to attempt to free him. When Calia is attacked and sexually harassed by some of the marauders, Andrew instinctively demonstrates superhuman strength and resilience, easily defeating the thugs and surviving being cut down by their leader, who is fatally stabbed by Calia. Calia finds machinery in one of Andrew's wounds, causing her to become upset and abandon Andrew. The two are then captured and brought to Walsh, who tells them that Andrew, the first in a new generation of machines, was designed to kill any remaining humans. Andrew the machine has his long-dead eponym's memories, which Walsh makes Andrew search for clues about Aurora’s location. Andrew instead envisions his mother, Veronica, who reminds him that he's still her loving son. This helps Andrew the machine identify with his eponymous self. Andrew overrides Walsh's program and escapes with Calia.

Andrew and Calia spot the lights of what they believe to be Aurora, but only find an empty city. Damien concludes that Aurora was a myth after all, ordering his robot drones to kill them and all remaining humans, having kept the few scavengers and marauders alive only to follow them to Aurora. As the robots start carpet bombing the few remaining humans, Andrew and Calia flee underground, finding a high-tech room. Reacting to the presence of a human, the room reveals itself to be the control room of a space ship which sets course for Aurora - a distant planet rather than an Earth-based settlement. With Kronos' bombs approaching, Andrew and Calia activate the ship's hyperdrive to escape despite the threat that when they reach Aurora, the humans there will destroy Andrew due to his robotic nature.

Now possessing the location of Aurora, Elias betrays and kills Damien. Andrew and Calia arrive at Aurora which proves to be a lush planet with futuristic cities. In a voiceover, Calia proclaims that Kronos will come after Aurora, but that with Andrew, a machine that may be more human than anyone else, they stand a chance. Watching a massive fleet launching towards Aurora, Elias proclaims that the last of humanity will face their fate once he reaches Aurora.

Cast
 Julian Schaffner as Andrew Davis
 John Cusack as Elias VanDorne
  as Calia
 Carmen Argenziano as Damien Walsh
 Eileen Grubba as Veronica Davis, Andrew's mother.
 Ego Nwodim as Assistant

Production
Singularity began as a low-budget sci-fi film called Aurora, which was shot in 2013 in the Czech Republic and Switzerland. John Cusack was not involved in the original shoot. Years later, scenes with Cusack interacting only with Argenziano were shot and inserted into the new production, and extensive CGI effects were used to tie the new material to the original film.

Reception
Jason Pirodsky from The Prague Reporter gave a negative review, criticizing production values, continuity errors, and the film's "thoroughly unconvincing narrative", adding that 80% of it consisted of "Wacker and Schaffner aimlessly walking around Czech forests in search for Aurora, the fabled last outpost of humanity that they don’t really know anything about". Pirodsky also criticized the addition of Cusack, noting that he only interacts with one other character as his performance was shot years after the majority of scenes were filmed.

References

External links
 Singularity at Voltage Pictures
 
 
 

2017 films
2017 science fiction films
Alien invasions in films
American robot films
American dystopian films
Mecha films
Films shot in the Czech Republic
American science fiction films
2010s English-language films
2010s American films
Films set in 2020
Films set in the 2020s